Conservative Students may refer to:
Federation of Conservative Students, United Kingdom
Conservative Students (Denmark)